The Atlantic sharpnose shark (Rhizoprionodon terraenovae) is a species of requiem shark in the family Carcharhinidae. It is found in the subtropical waters of the north-western Atlantic Ocean, between latitudes 43°N and 18°N.

Description
The Atlantic sharpnose shark is a small shark in comparison to others. Reports exist of these sharks living up to 12 years in the wild. A distinctive feature is that juveniles have black edges on the dorsal and caudal fins.

Habitat
Atlantic sharpnose sharks can be found as far north as New Brunswick, Canada, to as far south as the southern Gulf of Mexico. Reports of specimens from Brazil are likely being confused with the Brazilian sharpnose shark. Atlantic sharpnose sharks prefer to live in  warmer shallow coastal waters.

Feeding habits
The diet of the Atlantic sharpnose sharks mostly consists of bony fish, worms, shrimp, crabs, and mollusks. Commonly consumed fish include menhaden, eels, silversides, wrasses, jacks, toadfish, and filefish.

Maturation

Reproduction
Female Atlantic sharpnose sharks are viviparous, and tend to have a litter of four to six pups, but litter size may range from one to seven pups, after a gestation period of 10–11 months. Females are found in the marine estuaries during the late spring, but they breed mostly throughout the year.

Captivity
Generally, Atlantic sharpnose sharks are better suited for public aquaria, or very experienced private shark aquarists who are capable of caring for them. These sharks are highly active swimmers and require ample space. Also, these sharks tend to do best in small schools of at least three sharks. Tanks or ponds which are round or oval-shaped are best suited for these sharks. They have been reported to live at least 4 years in captivity.

References

Atlantic sharpnose shark
Viviparous fish
Fish of the Eastern United States
Fish of the Western Atlantic
Atlantic sharpnose shark